The Motor (later, just Motor) was a British weekly car magazine founded on 28 January 1903 and published by Temple Press. It was initially launched as Motorcycling and Motoring in 1902 before the title was shortened. From the 14 March 1964 issue the magazine name was simply Motor. Compared to rival The Autocar (later, just Autocar), Motor was more informative and more conservative.

The magazine usually included:
 News and scoops of the latest cars
 Motorsport news and results
 Car reviews – normally two, both 2 pages long with specifications and impressions.
 Road tests – one per week and very detailed

In 1988, the journal was absorbed by its long-standing rival Autocar, which became, from the 7 September issue, Autocar & Motor. Six years later, with the 21 September 1994 issue, the name reverted to Autocar.

References

1903 establishments in the United Kingdom
1988 disestablishments in the United Kingdom
Automobile magazines published in the United Kingdom
Weekly magazines published in the United Kingdom
Defunct magazines published in the United Kingdom
Magazines established in 1903
Magazines disestablished in 1988